Clara Morris (1846-9 – November 20, 1925) was an American actress.

Early life
Actress Clara Morris was born in Toronto, the eldest child of a bigamous marriage. Sources disagree on the year of her birth, writing it as any of the years from 1846 – 1849, inclusive.

When she was three, her father, whose name was La Montagne, was exposed as a bigamist and her mother moved with Clara to Cleveland, where they adopted Clara's grandmother's name, Morrison. Young Clara received only scanty schooling. In circa 1860 she became a ballet girl in the resident company of the Cleveland Academy of Music, shortening her name to Morris at that time. At the Cleveland Academy of Music, Morris worked under the management of John A. Ellsler.

Career

Stage 
After nine years of training with that company she played a leading lady at Wood's Theatre in Cincinnati in 1869. She then appeared in Halifax, Nova Scotia for a summer and with Joseph Jefferson in Louisville before going to New York City in 1870. She made her New York debut in September in "Man and Wife," directed by Augustin Daly at his Fifth Avenue Theatre. The role had come to her by chance, but she made such an impression in it that Daly starred her in a series of highly emotional roles over the next three years in such plays as "No Name," "Delmonico's," "L'Article 47," "Alixe," "Jezebel," and "Madeline Morel."

Mr. Daly engaged her to play in the Fifth-avenue Theatre, then located on West Twenty-fourth street; not as a leading act, but to fill whichever roles he deemed necessary. In the season of 1870–71, Man and Wife was in preparation for opening when the lead lady originally designated to play the role of Anne Silvester declined the part, and Ms. Morris stepped up to the position. On the opening night, September 13, she made her debut in a major city, and ended up being recalled in an early scene in the play before the act was terminated - an unusual occurrence in the theatre at the time.

She left Daly in 1873 and in November of that year starred under A.M. Palmer's management in "The Wicked World" at the Union Square Theatre.

In 1872, she made a sensation in L'Article 47. Other successes followed and she became known as an actress distinguished for spontaneity and naturalness.

Over the next few years Morris had great successes in "Camille" in 1874, "The New Leah" in 1875, "Miss Multon" (an American version of a French version of "East Lynne"), her most popular role, in 1876, "Jane Eyre" in 1877, and "The New Magdalen" in 1882. She also toured extensively, especially in the 1880s, and everywhere mesmerized audiences with her emotional power. Although neither a great beauty nor a great artist, nor trained in elocution or stagecraft, she had an instinctive genius for portraying the impassioned and often suffering heroines of French melodrama.

The passing of the vogue for that sort of theatre, together with her uncertain health, brought her career to a close in the 1890s.

Writing 
In retirement in Riverdale, New York, she contributed articles on acting to various magazines, wrote a daily newspaper column for ten years, and published numerous books.

Personal life 
She married Frederick C. Harriott on November 30, 1874; Morris supported Harriott until he started acting with her, in 1892.

Later life and death 
In 1910, Morris became blind, and experienced poverty. The house in which she had lived for 37 years was sold in 1914, and she moved to Whitestone, Long Island.

She died in New Canaan, Connecticut, on November 20, 1925, of a heart attack.

Legacy 
There is a plaque on the grounds of the Cleveland Public Library marking the location of Clara Morris' home when she was young. The plaque reads: "On this site, in her girlhood, lived Clara Morris. With limited opportunities she overcame privation and, in her twenties, was recognized as the leading emotional actress on the American stage."

The Clara Morris School, located at 1900 St. Clair Avenue NE, was part of the Cleveland Metropolitan School District until the building was torn down in 1968. Opened in 1868, the building was originally named the St. Clair School and held 16 rooms with "the windows, pointed in the Gothic manner."

Roles 

Other notable roles of her career are:

 Lucy Carter in Saratoga
 Mme. D'Artigues in Jezebel
 Tilburnia in The Critic
 Magdalen Vanstone in No Name
 Constance Sherman in Delmonico's, or Larks Up the Hudson
 Miss Lulu Tibbetts in An Angel

Works 
For some years after 1885, she devoted herself mainly to literary work, writing:

 A Silent Singer (1899)
 Little Jim Crow, and Other Stories of Children (1900)
 Life on the Stage: My Personal Experiences and Recollections (1901)
 A Pasteboard Crown (1902)
 Stage Confidences (1902)
 The Trouble Woman (1904)
 The Life of a Star (1906)
 Left in Charge (1907)
 New East Lynne (1908)
 A Strange Surprise (1910)
 Dressing Room Receptions (1911)

In her book Life on the Stage: My Personal Experiences and Recollections she recounts her meeting with John Wilkes Booth the assassin of Abraham Lincoln.

In culture 
Barbara Wallace Grossman published A Spectacle of Suffering: Clara Morris on the American Stage in 2009, chronicling Morris' "importance as a feminist in the late nineteenth and early twentieth centuries."

See also
 Edith McKay
 Agnes Bennett
 Mabel Atkinson
 Kathleen Coleman
 Jessie Ann Scott
 Olive Kelso King
 Mary de Garis

References 

 McKay and Wingate, Famous American Actors of To-Day, (New York, 1896)
Matthews and Hutton, Actors and Actresses of Great Britain and the United States, (New York, 1886)

External links 

 Clara Morris biography at the Joseph Haworth site.
 19th Century Actor Autobiographies Ms. Morris recounts her meeting with John Wilkes Booth from Life on the Stage.
 
 
Diaries of Clara Morris, 1867-1924. at the Schlesinger Library, Radcliffe Institute, Harvard University
 Clara Morris papers at the Sophia Smith Collection, Smith College Special Collections
 Letters of Clara Morris in the collections of the Cleveland Public Library Digital Gallery

1840s births
1925 deaths
19th-century American actresses
American stage actresses
19th-century American novelists
20th-century American novelists
Actresses from Cleveland
Actresses from Toronto
American children's writers
American memoirists
American women novelists
Pre-Confederation Canadian emigrants to the United States
Vaudeville performers
Writers from Toronto
American women memoirists
American women children's writers
20th-century American women writers
19th-century American women writers
20th-century American non-fiction writers